María José Morales Salazar (born 22 February 1996) is a Costa Rican footballer who plays as a defender for AD Moravia and the Costa Rica women's national team.

References

1996 births
Living people
Women's association football defenders
Costa Rican women's footballers
Costa Rica women's international footballers